Calculus (from Latin calculus meaning ‘pebble’, plural calculī) in its most general sense is any method or system of calculation.  

Calculus may refer to:

Biology 

 Calculus (spider), a genus of the family Oonopidae
 Caseolus calculus, a genus and species of small land snails

Mathematics 
 Infinitesimal calculus (or simply Calculus), which investigate motion and rates of change
 Differential calculus
 Integral calculus
 Non-standard calculus, an approach to infinitesimal calculus using Robinson's infinitesimals
 Calculus of sums and differences (difference operator), also called the finite-difference calculus, a discrete analogue of "calculus"
 Functional calculus, a way to apply various types of functions to operators
 Schubert calculus, a branch of algebraic geometry
 Tensor calculus (also called tensor analysis), a generalization of vector calculus that encompasses tensor fields
 Vector calculus (also called vector analysis), comprising specialized notations for multivariable analysis of vectors in an inner-product space
 Matrix calculus, a specialized notation for multivariable calculus over spaces of matrices
 Numerical calculus (also called numerical analysis), the study of numerical approximations
 Umbral calculus, the combinatorics of certain operations on polynomials
 The calculus of variations, a field of study that deals with extremizing functionals
 Itô calculus An extension of calculus to stochastic processes.

Logic 
 Logical calculus, a formal system that defines a language and rules to derive an expression from premises
 Propositional calculus, specifies the rules of inference governing the logic of propositions
 Predicate calculus, specifies the rules of inference governing the logic of predicates
 Proof calculus, a framework for expressing systems of logical inference
 Sequent calculus, a proof calculus for first-order logic
 Cirquent calculus, a proof calculus based on graph-style structures called cirquents
 Situation calculus, a framework for describing relations within a dynamic system
 Event calculus, a model for reasoning about events and their effects
 Fluent calculus, a model for describing relations within a dynamic system
 Calculus of relations, the manipulation of binary relations with the algebra of sets, composition of relations, and transpose relations
 Epsilon calculus, a logical language which replaces quantifiers with the epsilon operator
 Fitch-style calculus, a method for constructing formal proofs used in first-order logic
 Modal μ-calculus, a common temporal logic used by formal verification methods such as model checking

Medicine 

 Calculus (dental), deposits of calcium phosphate salts on teeth, also known as tartar
 Calculus (medicine), a stone formed in the body such as a gall stone or kidney stone

Physics 

 Bondi k-calculus, a method used in relativity theory
 Jones calculus, used in optics to describe polarized light
 Mueller calculus, used in optics to handle Stokes vectors, which describe the polarization of incoherent light
 Operational calculus, used to solve differential equations arising in electronics

Formal language 

 Lambda calculus, a formulation of the theory of reflexive functions that has deep connections to computational theory
 Kappa calculus, a reformulation of the first-order fragment of typed lambda calculus
 Rho calculus, introduced as a general means to uniformly integrate rewriting into lambda calculus
 Process calculus, a set of approaches to formulating formal models of concurrent systems
 Ambient calculus, a family of models for concurrent systems based on the concept of agent mobility
 Join calculus, a theoretical model for the design of distributed programming languages
 π-calculus, a formulation of the theory of concurrent, communicating processes
 Relational calculus, a calculus for the relational data model
 Domain relational calculus
 Tuple calculus
 Refinement calculus, a way of refining models of programs into efficient programs

Other meanings 

 Battlefield calculus, military calculation of all known factors into the decision-making and action-planning process
 Calculus of negligence, a legal standard in U.S. tort law to determine if a duty of care has been breached
 Felicific calculus, a procedure to evaluate the benefit of an action, according to Bentham 
 Professor Calculus, a fictional character in the comic-strip series The Adventures of Tintin